Yevgeniy Lunyov (born 26 April 1976) is a Kazakhstani football forward.

He has played most of his career for the club FC Shakhter Karagandy, with spells at FC Irtysh Pavlodar, FC Zhenis Astana and FC Kairat.

Lunyov made 12 appearances and scored 3 goals for the Kazakhstan national football team from 2000 to 2004.

Career statistics

International goals

References

External links

1976 births
Living people
Kazakhstani footballers
Kazakhstan international footballers
FC Shakhter Karagandy players
FC Irtysh Pavlodar players
FC Zhenis Astana players
FC Kairat players
Association football forwards